Alfred Josef Ferdinand Jodl (10 May 1890 – 16 October 1946) was a German Generaloberst who served as the Chief of the Operations Staff of the Oberkommando der Wehrmacht – the German Armed Forces High Command – throughout World War II.

After the war, Jodl was indicted on charges of conspiracy to commit crimes against peace, planning, initiating and waging wars of aggression, war crimes, and crimes against humanity at the Allied-organised Nuremberg trials. The principal charges against him related to his signature of the criminal Commando and Commissar Orders. Found guilty on all charges, he was sentenced to death and executed in Nuremberg in 1946.

Early life and career

Alfred Jodl was educated at a military cadet school in Munich, from which he graduated in 1910. Ferdinand Jodl, who would also become an army general, was his younger brother. He was the nephew of philosopher and psychologist Friedrich Jodl at the University of Vienna. Jodl was raised Roman Catholic but rejected the faith later in life.

From 1914 to 1916, he served with a battery unit on the Western Front, being awarded the Iron Cross 2nd Class for gallantry in November 1914, and for being wounded in action. In 1917, he served briefly on the Eastern Front before returning to the West as a staff officer. In 1918, he was awarded the Iron Cross 1st Class for gallantry in action. After the defeat of the German Empire in 1918, he continued his career as a professional soldier with the much-reduced German Army (Reichswehr). Jodl married twice: in 1913 and (after becoming a widower) in 1944.

World War II

Jodl's appointment as a major in the operations branch of the Truppenamt ('Troop Office') in the Army High Command in the last years of the Weimar Republic put him under the command of General Ludwig Beck. In September 1939, Jodl first met Adolf Hitler. During the build-up to the Second World War, Jodl was nominally assigned as commander of the 44th Division from October 1938 to August 1939 after the Anschluss.

He was chosen by Hitler to be Chief of the Operations Staff of the newly formed Oberkommando der Wehrmacht (OKW) on 23 August 1939, just prior to the German invasion of Poland. Jodl acted as chief of staff during the invasion of Denmark and Norway. Following the Fall of France, Jodl was optimistic of Germany's success over Britain, writing on 30 June 1940 that "The final German victory over England is now only a question of time."

Jodl signed the Commissar Order of 6 June 1941 (in which Soviet political commissars were to be shot) and the Commando Order of 28 October 1942 (in which Allied commandos, including properly uniformed soldiers as well as combatants wearing civilian clothes, such as Maquis and partisans, were to be executed immediately without trial if captured behind German lines).

Jodl spent most of the war at the Wolf's Lair, Hitler's forward command post in East Prussia. On 1 February 1944, he was promoted to the rank of Generaloberst (Colonel general). He was among those slightly injured during the 20 July plot of 1944 against Hitler, during which he suffered a concussion.

On 6 May 1945, Jodl was awarded the Knight's Cross of the Iron Cross by Großadmiral Karl Dönitz, who had succeeded Hitler on 30 April 1945 as head of Germany and its armed forces.

Following regional surrenders of German forces in Europe, Jodl was sent by Dönitz to respond to the demand for  "immediate, simultaneous and unconditional surrender on all fronts."  Jodl signed the German Instrument of Surrender on 7 May 1945 in Reims on behalf of the OKW. The surrender to all the Allies was concluded on 8 May in Berlin. On 13 May, on the arrest of Generalfeldmarschall Wilhelm Keitel, Jodl succeeded him as Chief of OKW.

Trial and conviction

Jodl was arrested, along with the rest of the Flensburg Government of Dönitz, by British troops on 23 May 1945 and transferred to Camp Ashcan and later put before the International Military Tribunal at the Nuremberg trials. He was accused of conspiracy to commit crimes against peace; planning, initiating and waging wars of aggression, war crimes and crimes against humanity. The principal charges against him related to his signature of the Commando Order and the Commissar Order, both of which ordered that certain classes of prisoners of war were to be summarily executed upon capture. When confronted with the 1941 mass shootings of Soviet POWs, Jodl claimed the only prisoners shot were "not those that could not, but those that did not want to walk".

Additional charges at his trial included unlawful deportation and abetting execution. Presented as evidence was his signature on an order that transferred Danish citizens, including Jews, to Nazi concentration camps. Although he denied his role in this activity of the regime, the court sustained his complicity based on the evidence it had examined, with the French judge, Henri Donnedieu de Vabres, dissenting.

His wife Luise attached herself to her husband's defence team. Subsequently, interviewed by Gitta Sereny, researching her biography of Albert Speer, Luise alleged that in many instances the Allied prosecution made charges against Jodl based on documents that they refused to share with the defence. Jodl nevertheless proved that some of the charges made against him were untrue, such as the charge that he had helped Hitler gain control of Germany in 1933.

Jodl pleaded not guilty "before God, before history and my people". Found guilty on all four charges, he was hanged at Nuremberg Prison on 16 October 1946. Jodl's last words were reportedly "Ich grüße Dich, mein ewiges Deutschland""I salute you, my eternal Germany."

His remains, like those of the other nine executed men and Hermann Göring (who had taken his own life prior to his scheduled execution), were cremated at Ostfriedhof and the ashes were scattered in the Wenzbach, a small tributary of the River Isar to prevent the establishment of a permanent burial site which might be enshrined by Neo-Nazis. A cross commemorating him was later added to the family grave on the Frauenchiemsee in Bavaria. In 2018, the local council ordered the cross to be removed; however, in March 2019, a Munich Court upheld Jodl's relatives' right to maintain the family grave, while noting the family's willingness to remove his name.

Posthumous legal action
On 28 February 1953, after his widow Luise sued to reclaim her pension and his estate, a West German denazification court posthumously declared Jodl not guilty of breaking international law, based on Henri Donnedieu de Vabres's 1949 disapproval of Jodl's conviction. This not guilty declaration was revoked by the Minister of Political Liberation for Bavaria on 3 September 1953, following objections from the United States; the consequences of the acquittal on Jodl's estate were, however, maintained.

Decorations
 Iron Cross (1914) 2nd Class (20 November 1914) and 1st Class (3 May 1918)
 Clasp to the Iron Cross (1939) 2nd Class (30 September 1939) and 1st Class (23 December 1939)
 Knight's Cross of the Iron Cross with Oak Leaves
 Knight's Cross on 6 May 1945 as Generaloberst and Chef des Wehrmachtfuhrungsstabes im OKW
 Oak leaves on 10 May 1945. The award was unlawfully presented on 10 May 1945.

References

Sources

External links
 Alfred Jodl – United States Holocaust Memorial Museum
 

1890 births
1946 deaths
Colonel generals of the German Army (Wehrmacht)
Executed military leaders
Executed people from Bavaria
Former Roman Catholics
German Army personnel of World War I
German former Christians
German people convicted of crimes against humanity
German people convicted of the international crime of aggression
Holocaust perpetrators
Military personnel from Würzburg
People executed by the International Military Tribunal in Nuremberg
People executed for crimes against humanity
People from the Kingdom of Bavaria
Recipients of the clasp to the Iron Cross, 1st class
Recipients of the Knight's Cross of the Iron Cross with Oak Leaves
Recipients of the Order of Michael the Brave, 2nd class
Recipients of the Order of the Cross of Liberty, 1st Class
Reichswehr personnel